Anse-à-Galets is a commune and city in the La Gonâve Arrondissement, in the Ouest department on Gonâve Island in Haiti, located to the west-northwest of Port-au-Prince in the Gulf of Gonâve. It is the largest commune on the island and has 62,559 inhabitants.

The current mayor of the city of Anse-a-Galets is  Ernso Louissaint.

Transportation
The commune is served by Anse-à-Galets Airport and a public wharf.  The public wharf has daily ferry traffic to the Haitian mainland at the Carries Ferry terminal.

References

Populated places in Ouest (department)
Communes of Haiti